Dunama is a genus of moths of the family Notodontidae described by William Schaus in 1912.

Taxonomy 
Schaus established the genus Dunama in 1912 for a group of small, relatively drab, mottled and tree-bark patterned, brown notodontid moths with a black orbicular spot. Edward L. Todd revised the genus whose distribution extends from Mexico to Amazonian Brazil in 1976. He described two new species and listed two species, D. angulinea and D. tuna from Costa Rica and D. angulinea  was reared in Panama for study in 1976. One additional species was recently described by James S. Miller and Paul Thiaucourt from Ecuador in 2011. The genus traditionally has been placed in the Nystaleinae, but that placement remains provisional because species of Dunama lack the characteristic morphological traits of most nystaleines. Additionally, all known caterpillars of Dunama feed on monocots (Musaceae, Marantaceae, Heliconiaceae, Arecaceae), a trait rarely encountered in the Notodontidae.

Species 
The genus includes the following species:
 Dunama angulinea Schaus, 1912
 Dunama biosise Chacón, 2013
 Dunama claricentrata (Dognin, 1916)
 Dunama indereci Chacón, 2013
 Dunama janecoxae Chacón, 2013
 Dunama janewaldronae Chacón, 2013
 Dunama jessiebancroftae Chacón, 2013
 Dunama jessiebarronae Chacón, 2013
 Dunama jessiehillae Chacón, 2013
 Dunama mattonii J.S. Miller, 2011
 Dunama mexicana Todd, 1976
 Dunama ravistriata Todd, 1976
 Dunama tuna (Schaus, 1901)

References 

 Todd, E. L. (1976). "A revision of the genus Dunama Schaus (Notodontidae)". Journal of the Lepidopterists' Society. 30 (3): 188–196.
 

Notodontidae of South America